Mumiy Troll is a Russian rock group, founded in 1983 in Vladivostok by vocalist and songwriter Ilya Lagutenko. The name translates to "mummy troll" and is a pun on Mumintroll, the children's books by Tove Jansson.

Career
Ilya Lagutenko founded Mumiy Troll in Vladivostok on 16 October 1983. In 1985, the group recorded their first album, Novaya luna aprelya, which was distributed as magnitizdat.

Mumiy Troll disbanded when Lagutenko was conscripted into the Russian navy. In 1990, they briefly reunited and released their second album, Delay Yu-Yu, on tape. Having studied Chinese and English at the Oriental Studies Institute of the Far Eastern Federal University, Lagutenko worked in China and London from 1991 to 1995. In 1995, he returned to Russia and reformed the band.

In May 1997, Mumiy Troll released their first studio album, Morskaya, which brought them wide popularity. Six months later, they released their second studio album, Ikra.
In 1998, MTV began broadcasting in Russia and Mumiy Troll's music video for the song "Vladivostok 2000" was the first music video by a Russian artist shown on the channel.

In 2001, the group represented Russia in the Eurovision Song Contest and came in 12th place. Time Out (London) wrote that they 'stole the show' by standing out as snakeskin heroes amongst all the taffeta and tuxedos.

The group wrote and produced soundtracks for a full-length cartoon movie and gave a new sound to classic Russian silent sci-fi movie and donated tracks to feature films including Russian blockbuster Night Watch, where Lagutenko also plays the Vampire. His face is on the cover of the American release.

Their 2005 album Sliyaniye i pogloshcheniye was called back from the printers on the day of release when distributors realized that the bride and groom on the cover were wearing masks of Putin and Mikhail Khodorkovsky. The band changed them into symbols of hearts and United States dollars respectively.
In 2008, the band signed with the Agency Group. In 2009, they released the album Comrade Ambassador, their first album to be made commercially available in North America, and toured North America to promote it. In 2012, Mumiy Troll released their first English-language album, Vladivostok.

In 2013, they released the album SOS matrosu, written during the band's round-the-world trip on a 19-century sailing ship in locations.

In 2015, they released album Piratskie kopii and in 2016, the English-language album Malibu Alibi.

In 2011, the first Mumiy Troll Music Bar was opened in Vladivostok. In 2015, Lagutenko opened a second Mumiy Troll Music Bar in Moscow.

The group has participated in various international festivals and music conferences, including SXSW, Culture Collide, Zandari Festa, Mu:Con, Sound City, and Visual Japan Summit. In 2013, they founded their own showcase festival "Vladivostok Rocks" (V-ROX). The festival was dubbed "a small Pacific Woodstock" by Russia Beyond The Headlines. V-ROX was held annually from 2013 to 2019. The 2020 edition of the festival was postponed due to the COVID-19 pandemic.

Mumiy Troll was the first to support the activities of PSI organization fighting AIDS in Russia and performed at the No Name Fever exhibition for AIDS in Gothenburg, Sweden in 2005. They are also well known for conservation activities on wild life in Far-East taiga and helping local minorities to survive. Ilya Lagutenko is a patron of the British-Russian Amur fund for the protection of Amur tigers and leopards.

In 2022, the group condemned the Russian invasion of Ukraine and, as a result, had all their concerts in Russia canceled by the authorities.

Style
Lagutenko lived in London in the 1990s and was influenced by the Britpop scene at the time. Lagutenko has described the band's style as "rockapops."

Members
Ilya Lagutenko – lead vocals, guitar, keyboard, acoustic guitar, tambourine
  – drums
 – keyboards
Artyom Kritsin – guitar
Pavel Vovk – bass guitar

Discography
 1985 – Novaya luna aprelya
 1990 – Delay Yu-Yu
 1997 – Morskaya
 1997 – Ikra
 1998 – Shamora – pravda o Mumiyakh i Trollyakh
 1998 – S novym godom, Kroshka!
 2000 – Tochno rtut' aloe
 2002 – Meeamury
 2004 – Pohititeli knig
 2005 – Sliyaniye i pogloshcheniye
 2007 – Amba
 2008 – 8
 2009 – Comrade Ambassador – US release (in Russian)
 2010 – Paradise Ahead – US EP Release
 2012 – Vladivostok
 2013 – SOS matrosu
 2015 – Piratskie kopii
 2016 – Malibu Alibi
 2016 – #31E
2018 – Vostok X Severozapad

Awards
 1997 The Best Still Image 1996 for Utekai (Slip Away) The Best Still Image 1997 for Delfiny (Dolphins) – the award from the Pokolenie Video Festival.
 1997 The Best Rock Group 1997 – Ovation prize from the Russian Music Academy.
 1997 The Best Group 1997, The Best Album 1997 for Morskaya (Nautical), The Best Song 1997 for Utekai (Slip Away), The Best Group 1998, The Best Video 1998 for Delfiny (Dolphins), The Best Video 1999 for Nevesta? (Bride?), The Best Musical Site 1999 – Russian music magazine Fuzz prize
 November 2002  Golden Disk according to the Meamories album sales in Latvia.
 2002 Zolotoy Grammofon (Golden Gramophone) premium (for the most popular song at Russkoe Radio in 2002) was awarded for the song Eto po lyubvi (Based on Love).
 2002 The Best Group 2002, The Best Song 2002 for Eto po lyubvi (Because of love) – the Poboroll prize from Nashe Radio.
 May 2004 Golden Disk according to the Pohititeli Knig album sales in Latvia.
 2005 The Best Album 2005 for Sliyanie i Pogloshenie (Merger and Acquisition) – Russian music magazine Fuzz prize.
 2006 Animation category – video clip Strakhu Net – Russian Flash Awards prize.
 2006 For the contribution to rock-art – Russian music magazine Fuzz prize.
 2006 Legend of MTV – MTV Russia Music Awards.
 2008 The Best Album 2008 – Mumiy Troll, «8» – Chartova Duzhina
 2008 The Best Music 2008 – Mumiy Troll, Contrabands – Chartova Duzhina
 2008 Internet 2008 – Mumiy Troll, www.mumiytroll.com – 
 2008 CD 2008 – Mumiy Troll, «8» – 
 2009 The Best Group 2009 – Mumiy Troll – Chartova Duzhina

References

External links 

 
 

Musical groups established in 1983
Musical groups from Moscow
Russian rock music groups
Eurovision Song Contest entrants for Russia
Eurovision Song Contest entrants of 2001
Russian alternative rock groups
Soviet rock music groups
Winners of the Golden Gramophone Award
Russian activists against the 2022 Russian invasion of Ukraine